The 2020 Liga 3 West Java Series 1 would be the fifth editions of Liga 3 (formerly known as Liga Nusantara) as a qualifying round for the national round of 2020 Liga 3. But cancelled due to the COVID-19 pandemic in Indonesia. 

PSKC Cimahi, winner of the 2019 Liga 3 West Java Series 1 are the defending champions also promoted to 2020 Liga 2 after being runner-up of 2019 Liga 3. The competition begin in October 2020.

Teams

Team changes 

Promoted to Liga 2
 PSKC Cimahi

Relegated from Liga 2
 Bandung United
 PSGC Ciamis

Transferred from Pre-national Route
 Persika

Promoted from Series 2
 Bareti 1698
 Galuh
 Persigar Garut

Relegated to Series 2
 Bintang Muda
 PSIT Cirebon
 Sultan Muda

Stadium and Location

Group stages

Knock-out stages

See also
 2020 Liga 3 West Java Series 2

References

2020 in Indonesian football
Sport in West Java
Liga 3 West Java